Bongkrek acid (also known as bongkrekic acid) is a respiratory toxin produced in fermented coconut or corn contaminated by the bacterium Burkholderia gladioli pathovar cocovenenans.

It is highly toxic because the compound inhibits the ADP/ATP translocase, also called the mitochondrial ADP/ATP carrier, preventing ATP from leaving the mitochondria to provide metabolic energy to the rest of the cell. The structure of bongkrekic acid bound to ADP/ATP translocase was solved in 2019, demonstrating that it binds to the substrate binding site, preventing ATP in the mitochondrial matrix from binding.

It has been implicated in deaths resulting from eating the coconut-based product known as tempe bongkrèk, which is banned in Indonesia. It was also responsible for 75 deaths and over 200 hospitalizations due to contaminated beer in a Mozambique funeral. In October 2020, nine members of a family in China died after eating corn noodles contaminated with the acid.

References

Toxicology
Carboxylic acids
Alkene derivatives
Ethers
ADP/ATP translocase inhibitors
Bacterial toxins